93rd Highland Regiment F.C. was a British association football club, formed out of the 93rd Sutherland Highlanders Regiment of Foot.

History
The regiment had been playing a form of football as far back as 1851, but as an organized club, it was founded in 1872; originally as a rugby football club, when the regiment was called the 93rd Sutherland Highlanders, and its home ground depended on where the regiment was based.  For example in 1872–73 it was in Aldershot and the following season in Woolwich.

Its best achievement in football came in 1890–91, when the regiment was based in Aldershot and entered the FA Cup.  The club won through the qualifying rounds - beating four future Football League clubs (Luton Town, Watford, Swindon Town, and Ipswich Town) - to reach the first round proper, or the last 32.  Drawn away to Sunderland Albion the regiment narrowly lost 2–0, in front of a crowd of 2,000.  The Highlanders had been accompanied to the match by the regimental pipers and the two teams dined together after the match at the Empress Hotel in Sunderland.  Goalkeeper Robertson - a replacement for the injured Urquhart - impressed the home side so much that he signed for Albion for 1891–92.  However the Highlanders were unable to follow up their exploits the following season as the regiment was sent to India in October 1891.

Highland League

Between 1912 and 1914, when the battalion (by now part of the Argyll & Sutherland Highlanders, but retaining the old name for the football team) was based in Fort George, the club played in the Highland League, finishing 7th in 1912–13 and 8th in 1913–14, both times out of nine clubs.

Colours

The club wore blue jerseys with a yellow St Andrew's cross on the left breast.

Records
FA Cup:
Best FA Cup performance: 1st round – 1890–91

Army FA Challenge Cup:
Winners: 1889–90, 1897–98
Runners-up: 1890–91

References

Defunct football clubs in Scotland
Military football clubs in Scotland
Defunct football clubs in England
Military football clubs in England